Scopula albiceraria is a moth of the family Geometridae. It was described by Gottlieb August Wilhelm Herrich-Schäffer in 1847. It is found in Transcaucasia and Siberia.

Subspecies
Scopula albiceraria albiceraria
Scopula albiceraria vitellinaria (Eversmann, 1851)

References

Moths described in 1847
albiceraria
Moths of Asia